Ernst Göte Hagström (7 September 1918 – 5 October 2014) was a Swedish long-distance runner. He competed at the 1948 Summer Olympics in the 3000 metre steeplechase and won the bronze medal behind teammates Tore Sjöstrand and Erik Elmsäter.

Hagström started as a middle-distance runner, but later focused on the steeplechase, in which he was ranked second in the world in 1948 and third in 1944 and 1945. In 1949 he won his only national title, in cross-country running. Hagström was a turner by profession and also competed in cross-country skiing.

References

1918 births
2014 deaths
People from Gagnef Municipality
Swedish male long-distance runners
Olympic bronze medalists for Sweden
Athletes (track and field) at the 1948 Summer Olympics
Olympic athletes of Sweden
Swedish male steeplechase runners
Medalists at the 1948 Summer Olympics
Olympic bronze medalists in athletics (track and field)
Sportspeople from Dalarna County
20th-century Swedish people